"Lightning Strikes" is a song by the American hard rock band Aerosmith from their 1982 album Rock in a Hard Place.  It is notable as Aerosmith's only charting song from the lineup without guitarist Joe Perry, who was replaced by Jimmy Crespo after he left the band in 1979.

The song was written by Steven Tyler, Jimmy Crespo and Richie Supa, a friend and collaborator of the band. Aerosmith guitarist Brad Whitford recorded his parts before leaving the band.

The song reached #21 on the U.S. Mainstream Rock Tracks chart.

Music video
The band created one of their earliest actual music videos for MTV and other networks with this song.  Directed by Arnold Levine, the music video flashes back and forth between the band performing in what appears to be a studio or small venue and then out on the streets, where the band members flash angry looks, and wield baseball bats, chains, knives, and other weapons, suggesting a fight is about to take place.  The song also features fake lightning strikes during the transitions between the band's performance and the streets, and baseball bats striking melons in the air.

Personnel
 Steven Tyler – lead vocals, keyboards
 Jimmy Crespo – lead guitar, backing vocals
 Tom Hamilton – bass guitar
 Joey Kramer – drums
 Brad Whitford – rhythm guitar

References

Aerosmith songs
1982 singles
Songs written by Steven Tyler
Songs written by Richard Supa
Song recordings produced by Jack Douglas (record producer)
Songs written by Jimmy Crespo
1982 songs
Columbia Records singles